Fort Crevier is a French fort built near the Saint-François River in Quebec.

In 1687, near Saint-François-du-Lac, the fort was built by Jean Crevier de Saint-François. It was also known as Fort Saint-François.  The fort's purpose was to defend the French inhabitants in the region against Iroquois attacks encouraged by the British.  It was attacked by the Iroquois in November 1689, and again in August 1693, when Crevier was killed.  The fort became an integral part of the Abenaki village of Saint-François in 1700, and was abandoned following the end of hostilities with the Iroquois in 1701.  The village was destroyed on 4 October 1759 by Rogers' Rangers (under Major Robert Rogers).  The population was decimated.  The village became Odanak afterwards.

It was designated a National Historic Site of Canada in 1920. A monument commemorating the fort was put in place by the Historic Sites and Monuments Board of Canada and unveiled in June 1939.

See also
List of French forts in North America
List of National Historic Sites of Canada in Quebec

References

External links
Fort Crevier National Historic Site of Canada

French forts in Canada
National Historic Sites in Quebec
1687 establishments in New France
1701 disestablishments in New France
Military installations closed in 1701
Military installations established in the 17th century